The 2018–19 Verbandspokal, (English: 2018–19 Association Cup) consisted of twenty-one regional cup competitions, the Verbandspokale, the qualifying competition for the 2019–20 DFB-Pokal, the German Cup.

All clubs from the 3. Liga and below could enter the regional Verbandspokale, subject to the rules and regulations of each region. Clubs from the Bundesliga and 2. Bundesliga could not enter but were instead directly qualified for the first round of the DFB-Pokal. Reserve teams were not permitted to take part in the DFB-Pokal or the Verbandspokale. The precise rules of each regional Verbandspokal are laid down by the regional football association organising it.

All twenty-one winners qualified for the first round of the German Cup in the following season. Three additional clubs were also qualified for the first round of the German Cup, these being from the three largest state associations, Bavaria, Westphalia and Lower Saxony. The Lower Saxony Cup was split into two paths, one for teams from the 3. Liga and the Regionalliga Nord and one for the teams from lower leagues. The winners of both paths qualified for the DFB-Pokal. In Bavaria the best-placed Regionalliga Bayern non-reserve team qualified for the DFB-Pokal while in Westphalia a play-off was conducted to determine this club.

Competitions
The finals of the 2018–19 Verbandspokal competitions (winners listed in bold):

Notes

References

External links
Official DFB website  The German Football Association
Fussball.de  Official results website of the DFB

2018–19 in German football cups
Verbandspokal seasons